The verdant universities are an informal group of Australian universities. They comprise universities founded in the 1960s and 1970s and are sometimes called "gumtree" universities. These universities were established in their state capitals, often next to native bush land (now nature reserves), and have lush vegetative campuses – which the naming "verdant" refers to. 

They are predominantly the second or third established university in their state; the only exception is Macquarie, which is the third university in Sydney, but the fourth university in New South Wales.

La Trobe University takes “verdant” a step further by the fact that it owns a 28-hectare wildlife sanctuary in addition to managing the Gresswell Hill Nature Conservation Reserve, situated north of the Melbourne campus.

The verdant universities were part of a broader effort to expand and reform tertiary education in Australia based on similar reforms that led to the creation of the plate glass universities group in the United Kingdom. All of these universities went on to form Innovative Research Universities in 2003.

Potential verdants 
While these five are considered the "main verdants" as they have the most in common, there are other universities that have been labelled as a verdant or gumtree university. These include:
 University of Newcastle (1965)
 James Cook University (1970)
 Deakin University (1974)
 University of Wollongong (1975)

See also 
Plate glass university
Robbins Report
Ivy League
Russell Group
Association of American Universities
Red brick university

References

College and university associations and consortia in Australia
Colloquial terms for groups of universities and colleges